Round Pond is a  pond in Plymouth, Massachusetts. The pond is adjacent to Long Pond to the southwest, and east of Long Pond village and Halfway Pond.

External links
Environmental Protection Agency
Six Ponds Improvement Association

Ponds of Plymouth, Massachusetts
Ponds of Massachusetts